The yu is an idiophonic tiger-shaped percussion instrument that was used in yayue, the ritual music of ancient China's Zhou dynasty.

Form
The yu is a hollow wooden box shaped and usually painted to resemble a tiger. The back is serrated with 27 teeth, sometimes positioned to match the stripes of the tiger.

Performance
The yu is played with a bamboo whisk with about 15 tines. The whisk is used to strike the head and to run across the serrated back.

Use
In antiquity, the yu was used to mark the end of a piece of music. The head was struck three times and then the back was crossed once to bring the music to a close. This contrasted with the zhu, a tapered hollow box whose inner bottom surface was struck to mark the beginning of music. Both instruments appear in Zhou-era annals and the Classic of History but are now rarely used, with surviving examples usually simply displayed in museums and Confucian temples. The Classic of Music that instructed creation and use of the yayue instruments is almost entirely lost, and aspects of modern construction and performance are guesswork or replacement. Nonetheless, a few templesincluding the main Taiwan Confucian Templestill use them for Confucian ceremonies. The reconstructed form is also used in Shaoxing Opera.

Legacy
The Korean eo is essentially identical to the yu and continues to be used in Korean ritual music. The Vietnamese ngu ( or ) is also essentially identical to the yu.

See also
 Raganella

References

External links
Page that talks about history of the Yu.
Page that talks about the history of the Yu.

Idiophones
Chinese musical instruments